Paul Rotterdam (born 12 February 1939) is an Austrian-born American painter.

Biography
Werner Paul Zwietnig-Rotterdam was born and grew up in Wiener Neustadt, Austria, (heavily bombed during World War II). He moved with his parents to Leoben where he attended Elementary and High School. In 1960 he moved to Vienna, briefly attended the Akademie der angewandten Kunst and enrolled at the University of Vienna to study philosophy.  In 1961 he had his first exhibition of paintings at the Galleria Numero in Florence. He had an exhibition for the first time in Vienna in 1962. Three years later he was selected to represent Austria at the Fourth Biennial of Young Artists in Paris and at the Eighth Biennial of International Art in Tokyo.  In 1966 he received a PhD in Philosophy from the University of Vienna.

At the age of 28 Paul Rotterdam was appointed Lecturer on Visual Studies at the Visual Arts Center, Harvard University, Cambridge, MA.  He delivered lectures on theoretical issues of 20th-century art and conducted studio courses on drawing. His first museum retrospective took place in 1970 at the De Cordova Museum in Lincoln, MA. In 1973 he moved his studio to a loft on West-Broadway in the Tribeca section of New York City. He continued teaching in the spring semesters at Harvard University.1975:Biennial Exhibition of Contemporary American Art, Whitney Museum, New York NY. 1976: Artists-Immigrants of America 1876-1976, Hirshhorn Museum, Washington DC. 1980: American Drawing 1970-1980, Brooklyn Museum, New York. 1986:National Drawing Invitational, The Arkansas Arts Center, Little Rock. 1991: Le Cabinet des Dessins, Fondation Maeght, Saint-Paul. 1997:The New York School, Museum of Contemporary Art, Tokyo.
In 1996 Rotterdam married the painter, Rebecca LittleJohn.  Paul Rotterdam was awarded the medal of honor for science and art from the Republic of Austria.2007 Retrospective exhibition of drawings at the Leopold Museum, Vienna. From 2007 his work is permanently represented by Galerie Erich Storrer, Zurich. In 2014 he publishes a selection of public lectures in German (Hirmer Verlag, Munich) and English (University of Chicago Press): "Wild Vegetation- From Art to Nature". In November 2014 he had a public discussion with the philosopher Konrad Paul Liessmann at the Leopold Museum in Vienna covering the topic of the sublime which in Modernism has become an important criterion to measure progress in art. In 2017 exhibition together with Rebecca LittleJohn at the Museum der Stadt Leoben, Austria. Lives in New York and Texas.

Style

Rotterdam's paintings are generally abstract and mostly monochrome or reduced in color. Three-dimensionality is an important feature in his work with forms often protruding from the pictorial plane into actual space.

Works in collections

Albertina, Vienna.
Busch-Reisinger Museum, Cambridge.
Birmingham Museum of Art, Birmingham.
Brooklyn Museum, New York.
Cornell University Art Museum, Ithaca.
Crystal Bridges Museum of American Art, Bentonville.
Des Moines Art Center, Des Moines.
Fogg Art Museum, Cambridge.
Fondation Maeght, Saint-Paul de Vence.
Solomon R. Guggenheim Museum, New York.
Hirshhorn Museum, Washington D.C.
Landesmuseum Joanneum, Graz.
Leopold Museum, Vienna.
Metropolitan Museum, New York.
Museum of Modern Art, New York.
Musée de Nice, Nice.
Musée l'Abbaye Sainte Croix, Les Sables d'Olonne.
Musée d'Art Modern-Beaubourg, Paris.
Musée d'Art Contemporain de Montréal, Montréal.
Museum der Stadt Leoben, Leoben.
Niederösterreichisches Landesmuseum, St.Pölten.
Ohara Museum, Tokyo.
The Arkansas Arts Center, Little Rock.
The National Museum of Art, Osaka.
The Power Institute of Fine Arts, Sydney.
The University of Arizona Museum of Art, Tucson.
Walker Art Center, Minneapolis.

Publications 

 Paul Rotterdam. Ausstellung 1965. Katalog, Galerie im Griechenbeisl, 1965.
 Carl Aigner (Hrsg.): Paul Zwietnig-Rotterdam. Worklist. painting, sculpture, projects. Werkliste. Malerei-Skulptur-Projekte. 1953–2004. Essays of Alvin Martin, Kenneth Wahl, Dore Ashton, Konrad Paul Liessmann, Joachim Rössl, Manfred Wagner, Prestel, München 2004 und 2007, .
 Alvin Martin: Paul Rotterdam: The 14 Stations of the Cross, The University of Texas at San Antonio, 1982
 Carter Ratcliff: Paul Rotterdam. Selected paintings 1972–1982, Storrer Edition, Zürich, 1982
 Joachim Rössl, Dore Ashton: Paul Zwietnig-Rotterdam. Work Catalogue 1969 – 1989 Hrsg. Von der Kulturabteilung des Landes Niederösterreich, Wien, 1989, 
 Kenneth Wahl:Paul Rotterdam: Selected drawings 1974–77, Storrer Edition, Zürich, 1977, .
 Townsend Wolfe: Paul Zwietnig-Rotterdam,  A Drawing Retrospective 1969–1994, The Arkansas Arts Center, Little Rock, 1995
 Paul Zwietnig Rotterdam: Wild Vegetation – From Art to Nature , Hirmer Verlag, Munich, 2014, 
 Gotthard Fellerer: Paul Z. Rotterdam schreibt ein neues Buch, BravDa, 3/4, Wiener Neustadt, 2014

External links
 

http://www.icaphila.org/exhibitions/past/index.php?artist=1095
http://www.jstor.org/stable/40970379
http://www.rebeccanemser.com/1981/02/work-on-paper/
http://www.csmonitor.com/1985/0619/urott-f.html
http://www.saatchi-gallery.co.uk/museums/museum-profile/Leopold+Museum/465.html
http://www.stadt-wien.at/kunst-und-kultur/archiv/paul-rotterdam.html
http://www.nextkunst.at/nextkunst/uploads/2011/01/China_Goes_Europe_Katalog.pdf
http://www.paulrotterdam.com, paintings, drawings
http://www.rebeccalittlejohn.com

1939 births
Living people
Austrian painters
Austrian male painters
20th-century American painters
21st-century American painters